WXPN (88.5 FM) is a non-commercial, public radio station licensed to The Trustees of the University of Pennsylvania in Philadelphia, Pennsylvania, that broadcasts an adult album alternative (AAA) radio format, along with many other format shows. WXPN produces World Cafe, a music program distributed by NPR to many non-commercial stations in the United States. The station's call sign, which is often abbreviated to XPN, stands for "Experimental Pennsylvania Network".

History
While the University of Pennsylvania has been involved with radio since 1909 when a wireless station was located in Houston Hall, WXPN itself first came into existence in 1945 as a carrier current station at 730 AM. In 1957, it was granted a full license as a 10-watt college radio station at 88.9 FM in addition to their frequency of 730 AM. From then into the mid-1970s, WXPN was a student activity of the university and as it grew, the station initiated unique programming designs including one of the earliest freeform radio formats, Phase II, in the 1960s. Local DJ Michael Tearson got his start at WXPN in the late 1960s with a radio show The Attic. Tearson went on to replace Dave Herman at WMMR in 1970. In 1975, a controversial broadcast on the talk show The Vegetable Report led to an obscenity complaint with the FCC, which found the charges serious enough to decline renewal of the broadcast license. This incident (December 1975) marked the first time FCC pulled a license on grounds of obscenity. But a citizen's group organized to petition the FCC to consider XPN's unique service, and with a pledge from Penn to create positions for professional staff to run the station, the FCC allowed the license to renew.

With this new staff of five managers, WXPN became a steady fountain of high-quality folk, jazz, new and avant-garde music and public affairs programming produced by a combination of station alumni and community volunteers, with little to no student involvement. Veterans of WXPN that have gone on to notable achievements in other areas include Broadway producer/director Harold Prince (the station's first program director), NBC News correspondent Andrea Mitchell (former news director); jazz producer Michael Cuscuna (former DJ) and Echoes producers John Diliberto and Kimberly Haas (former producers of Diaspar and other XPN shows).

Shows that have been staples on XPN since the '70s include The Blues Show with Jonny Meister (Saturday nights), Sleepy Hollow (Saturday and Sunday morning quiet music shows), Star's End (ambient and space music Saturday night/Sunday morning) and Amazon Country (lesbian-oriented music and programming on Sunday evening). XPN also broadcasts the Folk Show on Sunday evening, which started at WHAT-FM in 1962 and continued on WDAS-FM, WMMR, WIOQ and WHYY-FM but moved to WXPN in the '90s when WHYY changed to a talk format.

In 1986 the station qualified for membership in the Corporation for Public Broadcasting and began the legal process to move from 88.9 to 88.5 on the FM broadcast band in order to increase signal coverage. Beginning the late 1980s, the programming and personnel were shifted from its diverse volunteer voice to full-time salaried programmers. Penn student radio activity is currently carried out on WQHS.

In 1988, WXPN started Kids Corner, a daily interactive radio show for kids hosted by Kathy O'Connell. Kids Corner has won numerous awards, including the Peabody Award and the Armstrong Award.

In 2004, WXPN moved to new facilities at 3025 Walnut Street, where the radio station shares space with a music venue called World Cafe Live. (World Cafe Live is an independent for-profit entity that pays a yearly fee to license the World Cafe name from WXPN.)

In October 2015, WXPN and WNTI jointly announced a sales agreement for transfer of ownership of the Hackettstown, New Jersey, public radio station owned by Centenary College. The sale price is $1,250,000 in cash and another $500,000 in underwriting value over 10 years. A Public Service Operating Agreement enabled WXPN to begin using the WNTI transmission facilities to air WXPN programming, effective October 15, 2015. WNTI changed its call sign to WXPJ on May 16, 2016.

Programs
WXPN carries primarily locally originated programs, supplemented by a few nationally syndicated shows. The station's weekday programs are all produced by its own staff, including World Cafe, a show developed and hosted by WXPN host David Dye and now distributed by NPR. The station also produces most of its night and weekend specialty programs, including Kids Corner with Kathy O'Connell, The Geator's Rock & Roll, Rhythm & Blues Express with legendary Philadelphia DJ Jerry Blavat, The Blues Show with Jonny Meister, The Folk Show with Ian Zolitor and Sleepy Hollow, an early morning program of quiet music. The station's syndicated offerings include The Grateful Dead Hour with David Gans, The Many Moods of Ben Vaughn, Echoes with John Diliberto and Mountain Stage with Larry Groce.

Q'zine, produced and hosted by Robert Drake since 1996, is a voice for the LGBTQ community in Philadelphia. The program originated as Sunshine Gaydreams, later shortened to Gaydreams, in 1974.

WXPN also broadcasts the Penn Quakers men's basketball games.

From August 15 to August 18, 2019, WXPN broadcast a "Woodstock — As It Happened — 50 Years On" weekend to celebrate the 50th anniversary of the Woodstock festival. It used all of the festival's archived audio in "as close to real time as possible", using newly reconstructed audio archives of each of Woodstock's 32 performances.

Stations
One full-power station (WXPH) is licensed to simulcast the programming of WXPN full-time. One full-power station (WXPJ) currently has a Public Service Operating Agreement to simulcast the programming of WXPN.

Translators
WXPN programming is broadcast on the following translators:

From 1993 to 2007, the WXPH call sign was used on 88.1 in Harrisburg, now WZXM. WXPN traded that facility to Four Rivers Community Broadcasting in return for 88.7 Middletown and W259AU.

Portions of WXPN's schedule are simulcast on WKHS 90.5 FM, Worton, Maryland (Eastern Shore Chesapeake Bay and Baltimore, Maryland areas).

WXPN-HD2

XPN2/XPoNential Radio is an Adult Album Alternative radio station broadcast on the HD2 channels of WXPN in Philadelphia and WXPH in Middletown, Pennsylvania. The station is also syndicated to several other public radio stations, which air it on their HD2 or HD3 channels.

History
On May 2, 2007, WXPN launched an indie rock format on its HD2 channel, branded as "Y-Rock on XPN". Y-Rock on XPN featured on-air personalities originally from Philadelphia radio station WPLY 100.3 FM, branded as "Y100". WPLY owner Radio One changed the station's format in 2005, ending the alternative rock format. Y-Rock on XPN was the latest incarnation of the Y100 brand that originally aired on WPLY, which was the market's alternative rock station from 1995 until 2005.

In mid-June 2010, "Y-Rock on XPN" programming was cancelled due to budget cuts. The "Y-Rock on XPN" branding officially changed to XPN2 at midnight, June 15, 2011. The HD2 channel and companion online stream would later be re-branded as "XpoNential Radio".

WQHS

In 1970, WXPN-AM's operations moved from Houston Hall, directly in the center of campus, to 3905 Spruce Street. The FM radio station became professionally run by 1980, with former students and community volunteers staffing the station, while the AM radio station was still student-run. WXPN-AM then became WQHS, which stands for Quad Hill Superblock (referring to student dormitories on campus). As of September 2005, the radio station is located on the 5th floor of the Hollenback Center, on the far east side of campus.

In 2003, the WQHS radio tower, formerly on top of Harnwell College House, fell in a severe storm. As a result, WQHS now broadcasts exclusively over the Internet, in an eclectic freeform radio format.

References

External links
 

 Guide to the WXPN-FM Radio station records
 University of Pennsylvania
 XPoNential Radio
 World Cafe
 WQHS home page
 "Gaydreams" audio recordings held by John J. Wilcox, Jr. LGBT Archives, William Way LGBT Community Center

 
 
 
 

XPN
Adult album alternative radio stations in the United States
XPN
University of Pennsylvania
NPR member stations
Radio stations established in 1957
1957 establishments in Pennsylvania